Stadio del Conero was the home field of the Italian football club A.C. Ancona until 2010 when the club was canceled by every league.

Currently it is the home of U.S. Ancona A.S.D..

It is an all seater built in 1992 with a capacity of 23,967.

International matches
Three international matches of the Italy national football team have taken place at the stadium:

References

del Conero
del Conero
A.C. Ancona
U.S. Ancona 1905
Ancona